Michl Binderbauer is an Austrian-American physicist, entrepreneur and CEO of TAE Technologies, a private company dedicated to commercializing non-radioactive nuclear fusion power and other sustainable technologies. He is a co-inventor of many of the company’s advances in fusion energy, power management, and particle accelerators, and holds more than 100 U.S. and international technology patents. Binderbauer has published papers on plasma physics and fusion in peer-reviewed journals including Science, Physical Review Letters and Nature Communications. Binderbauer has been featured in Time, the New York Times, MIT Technology Review, and PBS NewsHour.

Career 
Over the last two decades, Binderbauer has established TAE as an industry leader in the field of fusion and expanded its portfolio to include power management solutions for electric mobility, grid storage and efficiency, and more. 

Binderbauer originally joined TAE as CTO, a position he held for 17 years. He then served as President for 18 months before being appointed CEO in 2017. Binderbauer is an expert in advanced beam-driven field-reversed configurations (FRC) and non-radioactive aneutronic fusion systems, two key differentiators in TAE’s approach to fusion power. As architect of the company’s research and development program, Binderbauer spearheaded a partnership with Google to apply machine learning and AI technology to fusion research.

Binderbauer serves on the Board of Directors of both TAE Technologies and TAE Life Sciences.

Education 
Binderbauer received a Bachelor of Science degree in Plasma Physics, a Master of Science degree in Physics from University of California, Irvine. He earned his Ph.D in Plasma Physics from UC Irvine in 1996, under the guidance of fusion energy pioneer, Professor Norman Rostoker. Binderbauer is a recipient of UC Irvine’s prestigious Lauds & Laurels Award and was, in 2018, one of  the inaugural inductees into UC Irvine’s School of Physical Sciences Hall of Fame. He sits on the Board of UCI Beall Applied Innovation.

References

Austrian physicists
University of California, Irvine alumni
Living people
1969 births